Markazi's codes are 47, 57 and 67. But 76 is not still in use In public cars, Taxis and Governal cars the letter is always the same. But in simple cars this letter (ب) depends on the city.

47
47 is Arak county and Khondab County's code and all of the letters are for Arak.

57

Road transport in Iran
Transportation in Markazi Province